Mary Theresa Schmich (born November 29, 1953) is an American journalist.  She was a columnist for the Chicago Tribune from 1992 to 2021, winning the Pulitzer Prize in 2012. Her columns were syndicated nationally by Tribune Content Agency. She wrote the comic strip Brenda Starr, Reporter for the last 28 of its 60 years and she wrote the 1997 column 'Advice, like youth, probably just wasted on the young', with the often quoted "Do one thing every day that scares you", frequently misattributed to Eleanor Roosevelt.  The article is often referred to as, 'Wear Sunscreen'.

Biography
Born in Savannah, Georgia, the oldest of eight children, Schmich spent her childhood in Georgia. She attended high school in Phoenix, Arizona, and earned a B.A. from Pomona College.

After working in college admissions for three years and spending a year and a half in France, Schmich attended journalism school at Stanford. She has worked as a reporter at the Palo Alto Peninsula Times Tribune, the Orlando Sentinel and since 1985 at the Tribune, where she was a national correspondent based in Atlanta for five years. Her column started in 1992 and was interrupted for a year when she attended Harvard on a Nieman Fellowship for journalists.

From 1985 Schmich was the writer of Brenda Starr, Reporter until its final appearance in January 2011. The long-lived comic strip, set in Chicago, was created by Dale Messick for the Chicago Tribune Syndicate in 1940. Messick continued to the early 1980s; Schmich was the third and final writer, working with the second and third artists.

She has also worked as a professional barrelhouse and ragtime piano player.

About four times a year for some years, Schmich and fellow Tribune metro columnist Eric Zorn wrote a week of columns that consisted of a back-and-forth exchange of letters. Each December since 1999, Schmich and Zorn have hosted the "Songs of Good Cheer" holiday caroling parties at the Old Town School of Folk Music to raise money for the Tribune Holiday Fund charities. On December 18, 2020, because of the COVID-19 pandemic, Schmich and Zorn held a virtual streaming event that was livecast over YouTube.

Schmich won the annual Pulitzer Prize for Commentary, recognizing 2011 work with the Tribune, citing "her wide range of down-to-earth columns that reflect the character and capture the culture of her famed city."

'Wear Sunscreen' 

Schmich's June 1, 1997 column began with the injunction to wear sunscreen, and continued with discursive advice for living without regret. In her introduction to the column, she described it as the commencement address she would give if she were asked to give one. The column was circulated around the Internet, with an erroneous claim that it was a commencement address by Kurt Vonnegut, usually at the Massachusetts Institute of Technology, and the misattribution became a news item when Vonnegut was contacted by reporters to comment. He told The New York Times, "What she wrote was funny, wise and charming, so I would have been proud had the words been mine."

In 1998, Schmich published the column as a book, Wear Sunscreen. In 1999, Baz Luhrmann released a song called "Everybody's Free (To Wear Sunscreen)" in which this column is read word for word as written by Schmich, who gave permission and receives royalties.  This song was a number one hit in several countries.

Schmich's June 1, 1997 column (as well as the Baz Luhrmann song based on it) includes the sentence:
"Do one thing every day that scares you."
This statement is notable because it is Schmich's original work, and yet frequently misattributed to Eleanor Roosevelt.

Works
 Wear Sunscreen (Andrews McMeel Publishing, 1998) . 54 pages
 Even the Terrible Things Seem Beautiful to Me Now: the best of Mary Schmich (Chicago: Midway, 2013) . – 415-page collection of "ten Pulitzer-winning columns along with 154 others"

See also

 List of newspaper columnists

References

External links

Schmich's column in the Chicago Tribune, now three weekly – archive apparently quite limited before August 2012
Advice, like youth, probably just wasted on the young – the so-called Wear Sunscreen column
The Cyber-Saga of the 'Sunscreen' Song
From column to song: 'Sunscreen' spreads to Chicago
 

American columnists
Chicago Tribune people
Pulitzer Prize for Commentary winners
Nieman Fellows
Pomona College alumni
Writers from Chicago
Journalists from Georgia (U.S. state)
Writers from Phoenix, Arizona
Writers from Savannah, Georgia
Writers from Atlanta
Living people
1953 births
Journalists from Arizona
20th-century American journalists
20th-century American women writers
21st-century American journalists
21st-century American women writers